Linnwood, is a historic home located at Ellicott City, Howard County, Maryland, United States. It is a large 1901 Queen Anne-influenced house consisting of a -story four-bay by four-bay frame structure with vinyl siding, a rubble stone foundation, and a hip roof with asphalt shingles.  Six domestic outbuildings are arrayed behind the house, including a springhouse/greenhouse, shop building/cold storage and annex, garage, smokehouse, privy, and a modern garage. A stone gateway with iron gates is located at the road, flanking the driveway. The house's Late Victorian form and appearance resulted from a thorough remodeling in 1901 of a preexisting farmhouse, according to designs by architect D. S. Hopkins.

Linnwood was listed on the National Register of Historic Places in 2006.

References

External links
, including photo from 2005, at Maryland Historical Trust

Queen Anne architecture in Maryland
Houses completed in 1901
Houses on the National Register of Historic Places in Maryland
Howard County, Maryland landmarks
Houses in Howard County, Maryland
Buildings and structures in Ellicott City, Maryland
National Register of Historic Places in Howard County, Maryland